Gemendhoo as a place name may refer to:

 Gemendhoo (Baa Atoll), Maldives
 Gemendhoo (Dhaalu Atoll), Maldives
 Gemendhoo (Noonu Atoll), an island of the Maldives